Nelmin-Nos (Nenets: Нельмин Саля, Neļmin Salja) is a village in Zapolyarny District, Nenets Autonomous Okrug, Russia. It had a population of 916 as of 2010, a decrease from its population of 970 in 2002.

Geography

Nelmin-Nos is about 35 km north of Naryan-Mar, located on the Pechora.

Climate

Nelmin-Nos has a subarctic climate (Dfc).

References 

Rural localities in Nenets Autonomous Okrug